The Spieler is a 1928 American drama film directed by Tay Garnett and starring Alan Hale, Clyde Cook and Renée Adorée. It was released as a part-talkie, during the transition from silent to sound film.

The film's sets were designed by the art director Edward C. Jewell.

Cast
 Alan Hale as Flash 
 Clyde Cook as Luke aka 'Perfesser' McIntosh 
 Renée Adorée as Cleo d'Alzelle 
 Fred Kohler as Red Moon 
 Fred Warren as The Baker 
 James Quinn as The Rabbit 
 Kewpie Morgan as Butch 
 Billie Latimer as Bearded Lady

References

Bibliography
 Munden, Kenneth White. The American Film Institute Catalog of Motion Pictures Produced in the United States, Part 1. University of California Press, 1997.

External links
 

1928 films
1928 drama films
1920s English-language films
Films directed by Tay Garnett
American black-and-white films
Pathé Exchange films
1920s American films